The Network for Integrity in Reconstruction is a network of civil society organisations from post-war countries that focus on the integrity in reconstruction.

Some of the organisations include Centre de Recherche sur l'Anti-Corruption, Luta Hamutuk, Chirezi Foundation and CAHURAST.

NIR as a network was established in 2005 on the basis of research and case studies.

The research and case studies set out to examine the impact of post-conflict reconstruction in eight states and regions which between them have received $65bn in aid: Afghanistan, Bosnia, Kosovo, Palestine, Lebanon, Mozambique, Sierra Leone and East Timor.

The Network for Integrity in Reconstruction is hosted by Integrity Action.

References

International nongovernmental organizations
International organizations based in Israel